Oľšavce is a village and municipality in Bardejov District in the Prešov Region of north-east Slovakia.

History
In historical records, the village was first mentioned in 1383.

Geography
The municipality lies at an altitude of 240 metres and covers an area of 5.048 km².
It has a population of about 165 people.

External links
 
Statistics

Villages and municipalities in Bardejov District
Šariš